Kampong Madewa is a village in Brunei-Muara District, Brunei, as well as a neighbourhood in the capital Bandar Seri Begawan. The population was 865 in 2016. It is one of the villages within Mukim Kilanas. The postcode is BF1120.

References 

Villages in Brunei-Muara District
Neighbourhoods in Bandar Seri Begawan